Vandalur is a census town and residential locality in Chennai, Tamil Nadu, India.

Vandalur may also refer to:
 Vandalur railway station
 Vandalur taluk

See also
 Vandalur Reserve Forest
 Vandalur Zoo